Raninagar is a town,and special village form district Ilsamari, with a police station,  not identified in 2011 census as a separate town, in the Raninagar II CD block in the Domkol subdivision of Murshidabad district in the state of West Bengal, India.

Geography

Location

Area overview
While the Lalbag subdivision is spread across both the natural physiographic regions of the district, Rarh and Bagri, the Domkal subdivision occupies the north-eastern corner of Bagri. In the map alongside, the Ganges/ Padma River flows along the northern portion. The border with Bangladesh can be seen in the north and the east. Murshidabad district shares with Bangladesh a porous international border which is notoriously crime prone (partly shown in this map). The Ganges has a tendency to change course frequently, causing severe erosion, mostly along the southern bank. The historic city of Murshidabad, a centre of major tourist attraction, is located in this area. In 1717, when Murshid Quli Khan became Subahdar, he made Murshidabad the capital of Subah Bangla (then Bengal, Bihar and Odisha). The entire area is overwhelmingly rural with over 90% of the population living in the rural areas.

Note: The map alongside presents some of the notable locations in the subdivisions. All places marked in the map are linked in the larger full screen map.

Civic administration

Police station
Raninagar police station has jurisdiction over  Raninagar II CD block.

CD block HQ
The headquarters of Raninagar II CD block are located at Raninagar.

Healthcare
Raninagar (Godhanpara) Rural Hospital at Raninagar functions with 15 beds.

See also
River bank erosion along the Ganges in Malda and Murshidabad districts

References

Cities and towns in Murshidabad district